Ykkönen (Finnish for 'Number One') is the second highest level of the Finnish football league system (after the Veikkausliiga), although it is the highest league managed by the Football Association of Finland. The teams also play a pre-season league cup, the Ykköscup.

History
The first league format competition in the second level of Finnish football was called , which was founded in 1936.

The name  has been used since 1995.

Competition
Like the Veikkausliiga, the first division is played mainly during the summer. It comprises 12 clubs, all of whom play 27 matches. After 22 games the division is divided to teams who finished 1-6 and 7-12. These teams play against each other once. The winner of the Ykkönen qualifies directly for promotion to Veikkausliiga, and the team finishing second in the league will play a two-legged promotion playoff against the team finishing 11th in the Veikkausliiga. The bottom 3 clubs are directly relegated to Kakkonen.

Clubs

The clubs in the Ykkönen for the 2023 season are:

Champions and top scorers 1973–2023

References

External links
League information; at the Football Association of Finland
List of League Second Level tables since 1930
 League321.com - Finnish football league tables, records & statistics database. 
Football scores for Finnish Football Leagues

 
2
Fin
1973 establishments in Finland
Recurring sporting events established in 1973
Professional sports leagues in Finland